Biosplice Therapeutics, Inc. (formerly Samumed, LLC) is a private biopharmaceutical company based in San Diego, California. It was founded in 2008 by Osman Kibar.

Samumed's products in development target novel components of the Wnt signaling pathway. The company focuses on potential treatments for several diseases; its osteoarthritis program is its most advanced.

References 

Pharmaceutical industry
Companies based in San Diego
Biopharmaceutical companies
2008 establishments in California
American companies established in 2008